The Swedish Road Administration, formerly The Royal Board for Public Road and Water Structures, was a  Government agency in Sweden. Its primary responsibility was to organise building and maintenance of the road network in Sweden.
Its headquarters were located in Borlänge.

History
The Swedish Road Administration was founded in 1841 as The Royal Board for Public Road and Water Structures and was responsible for Sweden's canals and roads.

In 1993 the National Road Safety Administration (Trafiksäkerhetsverket) was merged into SRA.

In 2009 the responsibility for the vehicle register and issuing of drivers' licenses, was moved to a new authority, Transportstyrelsen.  At the same time the department for the actual road work was separated from Vägverket into a government owned company, called Svevia.  For a number of year this department, then called Vägverket Produktion, was a profit-making organisation competing with private companies.

The agency was merged with the Swedish Rail Administration (Banverket) on 1 April 2010 to create the new Swedish Transport Administration (Trafikverket).

References

External links
Swedish Road Administration (to be phased out)
Information about the Swedish driver's license

Road Administration
Road authorities
1841 establishments in Sweden
2010 disestablishments in Sweden
Government agencies established in 1841
Government agencies disestablished in 2010
Borlänge
Transport organizations based in Sweden
Defunct transport organizations based in Sweden